Neil Durden-Smith OBE (born 18 August 1933, Richmond-upon-Thames, Surrey, England) is a former English sports commentator and first-class cricketer.

Life and career
Durden-Smith was educated at Aldenham School and the Britannia Royal Naval College in Dartmouth, Devon. His service as an officer in the Royal Navy from 1952 to 1963 included a period as aide-de-camp to the Governor-General of New Zealand, Lord Cobham, from 1957 to 1959.  He worked as a radio and television sports commentator and producer in England from the 1960s to the 1990s.

He played four matches of first-class cricket in the 1960s. His highest scores were 33 and 50 in his first match, for Combined Services against Nottinghamshire in 1961.

He was awarded the OBE in 1997. He has been married to Judith Chalmers, a television presenter, since 1964. They have a son and a daughter; their son, Mark, is also a television presenter.

References

External links
 Neil Durden-Smith at CricketArchive
 
 Neil Durden-Smith in Debrett's People of Today 

1933 births
Living people
People educated at Aldenham School
English cricketers
People from Richmond, London
Combined Services cricketers
Marylebone Cricket Club cricketers
English cricket commentators
Officers of the Order of the British Empire